Euseius olivi is a species of mite in the family Phytoseiidae.

References

olivi
Articles created by Qbugbot
Animals described in 1985